Alvin "AJ" Jackson was a jazz bassist.

His first performances were in a high school band with his younger brother, Milt Jackson, Willie Anderson, Lucky Thompson, Art Mardigan, and George Sirhagen, c. 1939-40.

About 1947, he was playing with Tommy Flanagan’s trio with Kenny Burrell, before briefly joining the house band led by Billy Mitchell at Detroit's Blue Bird Inn, before leading it himself in 1955.

The Billy Mitchell-led house band comprised Flanagan, Tate Houston and Milt Jackson, who had just returned from touring with Woody Herman.

While Alvin Jackson was leading the house band at the Blue Bird in 1955 the line-up comprised Yusef Lateef, Donald Byrd, Bernard McKinney, Barry Harris, and drummers Art Mardigan or Frank Gant.

In September 1959, with house drummer Frank Gant, he backed Thelonious Monk and Charlie Rouse at Detroit's Club 12.

Discography
As sideman
1948: Milt Jackson & his All Stars - Milt Jackson with John Lewis, Alvin Jackson, Kenny Clarke, and Chano Pozo 
1955: Byrd Jazz - Donald Byrd

1959: Pieces of Eighty-Eight - Evans Bradshaw 
1964: Vibrations (recorded 1960-1)

References

Living people
American jazz double-bassists
Male double-bassists
21st-century double-bassists
21st-century American male musicians
American male jazz musicians
Year of birth missing (living people)